is a shrine in Aizumisato, Fukushima, Japan. Isasumi was designated as the chief Shinto shrine (ichinomiya) for the former Iwashiro province.

Though not backed by accurate historical records, some believe the place name Aizumisato derives from this shrine. The shrine is also the locale for the annual taue-shinji, or rice planting, Shinto ritual. This ritual has been performed in this shrine for centuries, and the Fukushima Prefecture has designated the shrine an  Important Intangible Folk Cultural Property. Currently, the festival of the rice planting is known as the Otaue Festival. The festival falls on July 11 or 12 annually. The rice planting ceremony, held during the daytime, is considered as important and reverential as the Asataue, or morning planting, ceremony of the Ise Grand Shrine and the Yutaue (evening planting) held at the Atsuta Shrine. The rice planting ceremony at the Isasumi Shrine is widely regarded as one of the highlights of the Shinto rituals.

Notes

External links

 Official website 

Shinto shrines in Fukushima Prefecture
Aizumisato, Fukushima

Beppyo shrines